A short story is a piece of prose fiction.

Short Story may also refer to:
 "Short Story" (Casualty), an episode of the television series Casualty
 "Short Story" (Even Stevens), an episode of the television series Even Stevens
 Short Story (Gershwin), a 1925 composition by George Gershwin
 Short Story (horse), a racehorse

See also 
 Short Stories (disambiguation)